Greece v United Kingdom may refer to multiple court cases:
Ambatielos case, a 1952 case regarding state liability
Greece v United Kingdom (1956), a case heard by the European Commission of Human Rights